Ghesquierellana is a genus of moths of the family Crambidae.

Species
Ghesquierellana hirtusalis (Walker, 1859)
Ghesquierellana johnstoni (Tams, 1941)
Ghesquierellana phialusalis (Walker, 1859)
Ghesquierellana tessellalis (Gaede, 1917)
Ghesquierellana thaumasia Munroe, 1959

References

Spilomelinae
Crambidae genera